The Animal Welfare (Kept Animals) Bill is a proposed legislative act of the United Kingdom House of Commons relating to animal welfare and the export of certain animals. The Bill is sponsored by the Department for Environment, Food and Rural Affairs. The Bill would specifically prohibit the export of animals for slaughter or fattening for future slaughter.

The government promises that the Bill would create "the world's strongest" protections for kept animals and livestock.

Other provisions include outlawing the import of dogs with "cropped" ears.

Legislative history
The Animal Welfare (Kept Animals) Bill was introduced by George Eustice, to the House of Commons and received its first reading on 8 June 2021.

See also 
Animal Welfare (Sentience) Bill
 List of Acts of the Parliament of the United Kingdom, 2020–present

References

Proposed laws of the United Kingdom